Vineyard Landscape of Piedmont: Langhe-Roero and Monferrato is the official name of a UNESCO World Heritage Site comprising "five distinct wine-growing areas with outstanding landscapes" plus the Castle of Grinzane Cavour in the region of Piedmont, Italy.

The site, which extends over hilly areas of Langhe and Montferrat, is one of the most important wine producing zones in Italy.

Located in the center of Piedmont region (North West of Italy), the site is inscribed as a "cultural landscape", since it is a result of the combined work of nature and man. The site is inscribed in the UNESCO World Heritage List thanks to the outstanding value of its wine culture, which has shaped the landscape over the centuries.

Description
The site includes five distinct wine-growing areas of outstanding landscapes and the Castle of Grinzane Cavour, an emblematic name in vineyards development and Italian history. It is located in the southern part of Piedmont, between River Po and the Ligurian Apennines. It includes a full range of technical and economic processes related to viticulture and wine-making that characterized the region for centuries. They found in the area also pollen dated to the 5th century BC, when Piedmont was a place of contact and exchange between the Etruscans and Celts: in fact Etruscan and Celtic words, particularly those related to the wine, are still used in the local dialect. During the Roman Empire, Pliny the Elder mentioned the region as one of the most favorable for the cultivation of vineyards in ancient Italy and Strabo wrote about its barrels.

Sites

See also
Castle of Grinzane Cavour
Langhe
Montferrat
Piedmont
UNESCO

References

External links
 Association for the Heritage of the Vineyard Landscape of Langhe-Roero and Monferrato

 
World Heritage Sites in Italy
Monferrato
Langhe
Roero
Piedmont
Nizza Monferrato